Joseph James Donovan (2 November 1949 – 21 November 2001) was an Indigenous Australian amateur boxer who competed at the 1968 Mexico Olympics in the light-flyweight division. Joey's first round opponent, who he defeated when the referee stopped the contest, was Hungarian György Gedó. Gedó went on to win the gold medal in the same division in Munich 1972. Donovan is the great uncle of rugby league players Greg Inglis and Albert Kelly.

References

1949 births
2001 deaths
Indigenous Australian boxers
Olympic boxers of Australia
Boxers at the 1968 Summer Olympics
Indigenous Australian Olympians
Australian male boxers
Light-flyweight boxers
People from the Mid North Coast
Sportsmen from New South Wales